The men's hammer throw event at the 1990 Commonwealth Games was held on 27 January at the Mount Smart Stadium in Auckland.

Results

References

Hammer
1990